A Jailhouse Lawyer's Manual ("the JLM") is a resource for incarcerated individuals and jailhouse lawyers. It is published and distributed by the editors of the Columbia Human Rights Law Review, who are students at Columbia Law School. The JLM is designed to assist inmates in understanding their legal rights as prisoners. It contains information about how to challenge convictions and sentences, the rights of the incarcerated, and different ways to obtain an early release from prison.

History and content 

Founded in 1978, the eleventh and most recent edition of the JLM was published in 2017. A Spanish-language translation of the fifth edition of the JLM ("SJLM") was produced, but is now out of date; the JLM is working to release an updated SJLM within the next two years.  The book also has a section about human rights law.

Supplements 

In addition to the main manual, the JLM produces specific supplements for the following states:

Texas
Louisiana

The JLM is working to produce supplements for other states as well. The JLM also publishes an Immigration and Consular Access Supplement in both English and Spanish.

Cost 

Each year, over one thousand copies of the JLM are sent to prisoners, as well as to prisons and jails, libraries, and other organizations that work in the criminal justice field. For prisoners or their families, the cost of the JLM is $30; for institutions, the cost is $150. The JLM order form lists the cost to order the various publications, as well as instructions on how to place an order. A full copy of the JLM, separated by chapter, is available for free viewing on the JLM's website.

Reception 

Associate Justice of the Supreme Court of the United States Thurgood Marshall wrote in a 1992 forward to the JLM that "[b]y making difficult and sensitive legal issues accessible to the lay person, the manual helps to empower prisoners to exercise a right we, as a society, hold dear—the right to speak for oneself. I commend Columbia's law students for publishing so comprehensive and insightful a manual. A Jailhouse Lawyer's Manual should be read by everyone involved in, or concerned about, prisoners' rights."

References

American law journals
Columbia Law School
Columbia University publications
Human rights in the United States
Human rights journals
Imprisonment and detention in the United States
Law journals edited by students
Penal system in the United States
Publications established in 1978
Prison-related organizations